Meri Adalat is a 1984 Hindi film directed by A. T. Raghu. The film was a revenge drama featuring Rajinikanth in the lead, supported by Zeenat Aman, Mohnish Behl, Sonia Sahni and Komal Mahuakar. The song Gudiya Jaisi Behna Hai, sung by K. J. Yesudas was a big hit. The movie was dubbed in Tamil as Veetukku Oru Nallavan, It is a remake of director's own Kannada movie Aasha (1983) starring Ambareesh. This movie went on to inspire the 1991 Kannada movie Garuda Dhwaja also starring Ambareesh. The film flopped.

Plot 
It is the story of a brother played by Rajinikanth who is a tough cop and his sister played by Komal Mahuakar. The sister is in love with her college friend played by Mohnish Behl. It is the love story between them and the future incidents which make the cop take the law in his hands and have his own Adalat called Meri Adalat. Zeenat Aman a journalist plays the love interest of Rajinikanth supported by Kader Khan, Shreeram Lagoo, Rajendra Nath and others.

Cast 
 Rajinikanth as Inspector Ashok
 Zeenat Aman as Pramila
 Kader Khan as Mohanraj
 Shreeram Lagoo as Judge Rajaram
 Sonia Sahni as Sister
 Mohnish Behl as Arjun
 Komal Mahuvakar as Asha
 Rupini as Aasha

Music

References

External links 

1980s Hindi-language films
1984 films
Films scored by Bappi Lahiri
Hindi remakes of Kannada films